Mount Albert Edward can refer to:

 Mount Albert Edward in British Columbia, Canada
 Mount Albert Edward in Papua New Guinea